Spain participated in the Eurovision Song Contest 2011 with the song "Que me quiten lo bailao" written by Rafael Artesero. The song was performed by Lucía Pérez. The Spanish broadcaster Televisión Española (TVE) organised the national final Destino Eurovisión in order to select the Spanish entry for the 2011 contest in Düsseldorf, Germany. The national final consisted of two heats, a semi-final and a final and involved 24 competing acts. Three acts and nine songs ultimately qualified to compete in the televised final where an in-studio jury first selected one song per act to advance to the second round. In the second round of voting, a public televote exclusively selected "Que me quiten lo bailao" performed by Lucía Pérez as the winner.

As a member of the "Big Five", Spain automatically qualified to compete in the final of the Eurovision Song Contest. Performing in position 22, Spain placed twenty-third out of the 25 participating countries with 50 points.

Background 

Prior to the 2011 contest, Spain had participated in the Eurovision Song Contest fifty times since its first entry in 1961. The nation has won the contest on two occasions: in 1968 with the song "La, la, la" performed by Massiel and in 1969 with the song "Vivo cantando" performed by Salomé, the latter having won in a four-way tie with France, the Netherlands and the United Kingdom. Spain has also finished second four times, with Karina in 1971, Mocedades in 1973, Betty Missiego in 1979 and Anabel Conde in 1995. In 2010, Spain placed fifteenth with the song "Algo pequeñito" performed by Daniel Diges.

The Spanish national broadcaster, Televisión Española (TVE), broadcasts the event within Spain and organises the selection process for the nation's entry. TVE confirmed their intentions to participate at the 2011 Eurovision Song Contest on 1 October 2010. Between 2007 and 2010, TVE organised a national final to select both the artist and song that would represent Spain. The procedure was continued in order to select their 2011 entry.

Before Eurovision

Destino Eurovisión 
Destino Eurovisión was the national final organised by TVE that took place from 28 January 2011 to 18 February 2011 at the TVE studios in Sant Cugat del Vallès, Barcelona, hosted by Anne Igartiburu with Daniel Diges who represented Spain in the 2010 contest acting as the green room host. All shows were broadcast on La 1, TVE Internacional as well as online via TVE's official website rtve.es.

Format 
Destino Eurovisión consisted of 24 candidates competing over four shows: two heats on 28 January and 4 February 2011, a semi-final on 11 February 2011 and the final on 18 February 2011. Each heat featured twelve contestants performing cover versions of former Spanish Eurovision songs or winning Eurovision songs of their choice. A five-member jury panel first eliminated four contestants. The remaining eight contestants then faced a public televote and the three contestants with the most votes advanced to the semi-final. The jury then selected another two contestants to advance to the semi-final, with the remaining three contestants being eliminated. In the semi-final, the remaining ten contestants performed cover versions of Eurovision classics of their choice and the two contestants with the most public votes advanced to the final. The jury then selected another contestant to advance to the final, with the remaining seven contestants being eliminated. In the final, the three finalists each performed three candidate Eurovision songs selected from an open submission and the winner was decided over two rounds of voting. In the first round, the jury selected one song for each finalist for a second round of voting, during which the public determined the winner of Destino Eurovisión.

The members of the jury panel that evaluated the performances during the shows were:

 Albert Hammond – Singer-songwriter, music producer
 Merche (heats and semi-final only) – Singer-songwriter
 Reyes del Amor – Expert specializing in the Eurovision Song Contest
 David Ascanio – Singer-songwriter
 Boris Izaguirre – Television presenter, screenwriter, journalist
 Sole Giménez (final only) – Singer

Competing entries 
Two separate submission periods were opened from 15 November 2010 until 12 December 2010 for artists and songwriters to submit their applications and songs. Performer auditions took place in Barcelona and Madrid where 627 candidates participated. 30 candidates were shortlisted for a final audition round, where the twenty-four contestants were selected. 1,142 songs were received at the conclusion of the submission period, and an evaluation committee shortlisted twenty songs, which were previewed by TVE on their official website on 20 January 2011. Following the semi-final, nine of the twenty songs were selected and allocated to the three finalists of Destino Eurovisión. The allocation was announced on 16 February 2011.

Shows 
Each show featured a number of guest performances. Soraya Arnelas, Albert Hammond featured in heat 1; David Civera, Malú and Merche featured in heat 2; and Sergio Dalma, Pastora Soler and David Ascanio featured in the semi-final.

Final 
The final took place on 18 February 2011. The winner was selected over two rounds of voting. In the first round, each finalist performed three candidate songs and one song per finalist advanced to the second round by the jury who each awarded 1, 2 and 3 points to their top three songs performed by each finalist. In the vote to select Lucía Pérez's song, "Que me quiten lo bailao" and "Abrázame" were tied at 12 points each but since "Que me quiten lo bailao" received the most top marks from the jury the song advanced to the second round, despite Pérez and part of the studio audience preferring "Abrázame". In the second round, the winner, "Que me quiten lo bailao" performed by Lucía Pérez, was selected exclusively through a public televote. The percentages of the second and third placed acts were also revealed, but their names weren't known until 2020 when Blas Cantó revealed that he and his group Auryn came second.

In addition to the performances of the competing entries, guest performers included former Eurovision contestant Daniel Diges who represented Spain in 2010, British 2011 Eurovision contestants Blue, and jury members Sole Giménez and Albert Hammond.

At Eurovision
According to Eurovision rules, all nations with the exceptions of the host country and the "Big Five" (France, Germany, Italy, Spain and the United Kingdom) are required to qualify from one of two semi-finals in order to compete for the final; the top ten countries from each semi-final progress to the final. As a member of the "Big 5", Spain automatically qualified to compete in the final on 14 May 2011. In addition to their participation in the final, Spain is also required to broadcast and vote in one of the two semi-finals. During the semi-final allocation draw on 17 January 2011, Spain was assigned to broadcast and vote in the first semi-final on 10 May 2011.

In Spain, the semi-finals were broadcast on La 2 and the final was broadcast on La 1, TVE HD and TVE Internacional with commentary by José Luis Uribarri. The Spanish spokesperson, who announced the Spanish votes during the final, was Elena S. Sánchez. The broadcast of the final was watched by 4.724 million viewers in Spain with a market share of 32.3%. This represented a decrease of 9.6% from the previous year with 1.036 million less viewers.

Final 
Lucía Pérez took part in technical rehearsal on 7 and 8 May, followed by dress rehearsals on 13 and 14 May. This included the jury final on 13 May where the professional juries of each country, responsible for 50 percent of each country's vote, watched and voted on the competing entries. The running order for the semi-finals and final was decided by through another draw on 15 March 2011, and as one of the five wildcard countries, Spain chose to perform in position 22, following the entry from Iceland and before the entry from Ukraine.

The Spanish performance featured Lucía Pérez performing a choreographed dance routine on stage wearing a short pink dress with black inlays together with two backing vocalists and three dancers all dressed in white, with the outfits of the dancers equipped with LEDs that light up. The LED screens displayed dark red, yellow and blue flowers and a firework display effect. The performance also featured pyrotechnic effects. The choreographer for the performance was Lola González. The five backing performers that joined Lucía Pérez were Cristina Domínguez, Sandra Borrego, Amaury Reinoso, Juan Francisco Solsona "Nito" and Ginés Cano. Spain placed twenty-third in the final, scoring 50 points.

Voting 
Voting during the three shows consisted of 50 percent public televoting and 50 percent from a jury deliberation. The jury consisted of five music industry professionals who were citizens of the country they represent. This jury was asked to judge each contestant based on: vocal capacity; the stage performance; the song's composition and originality; and the overall impression by the act. In addition, no member of a national jury could be related in any way to any of the competing acts in such a way that they cannot vote impartially and independently.

Following the release of the full split voting by the EBU after the conclusion of the competition, it was revealed that Spain had placed sixteenth with the public televote and twenty-fourth with the jury vote. In the public vote, Spain scored 73 points and in the jury vote the nation scored 38 points.

Below is a breakdown of points awarded to Spain and awarded by Spain in the first semi-final and grand final of the contest, and the breakdown of the jury voting and televoting conducted during the two shows:

Points awarded to Spain

Points awarded by Spain

References

External links
  RTVE's official Eurovision website

2011
Countries in the Eurovision Song Contest 2011
Eurovision
Eurovision